Real  is the fifth studio album by American singer Belinda Carlisle, released on September 29, 1993, by Virgin Records. The album has a genre of mainly pop songs written by Charlotte Caffey, Thomas Caffey, Ralph Schuckett and half co-written by Carlisle. It was the second Belinda Carlisle album where Rick Nowels had no writing or producing credits and was also Carlisle's first album where she contributed to the producing. The album cover was designed by Tom Dolan and is a departure for Carlisle, who presented a glamorous look on all her previous covers, choosing a "jeans and tee shirt" look instead this time without make-up. The album features a cover version of the Graces' song "Lay Down Your Arms". 
Former Germs guitarist Pat Smear, as well as Redd Kross members Jeff and Steve McDonald, and The Bangles' Vicki Peterson appear on the record.

Reception and chart performance

AllMusic felt the album suffers from a lack of memorable songs and while the record sounded good, it had nothing to support the state-of-the-art production. It was also a departure from her previous solo albums, having more in common with Carlisle's the Go-Go's sound rather than her own, typical, solo pop themes. Dealing with what Carlisle termed the "dark side of relationships", the album is mature and intentionally lacks the slick production of her other solo albums. Carlisle won over many critics who had previously reviewed her for her sensed lack of progression and willingness to take a chance with some edgier material.

Real debuted on the UK Albums Chart at number nine on October 18, 1993, becoming Carlisle's fifth consecutive top-10 album there. The following week, it dropped down 11 places to number 20 and spent five weeks in the top 75. In Sweden, the album became her fifth top-30 album, peaking at number 23, spending only two weeks in the top 50. Australia was the last place the album charted, where it charted at number 61 and spent four weeks in the top 100.

Released in September 1993, the single "Big Scary Animal" reached number 12 on the UK Singles Chart, becoming Carlisle's seventh top-20 single, and a top 60 hit in Australia. This is also the most successful song co-written by Belinda Carlisle. "Lay Down Your Arms" was released as the second single in November 1993 and failed to gain much success, peaking at number 27 in the UK.

Real was re-released by Edsel Recording on August 26, 2013, as a two CD plus DVD casebook. It features the original album re-mastered, the single versions, demos, remixes, and live tracks. The DVD features the videos from the album and an exclusive interview with Carlisle, discussing the album.

Track listing

2013 remastered deluxe edition

Charts

Release history

References

1993 albums
Belinda Carlisle albums
Virgin Records albums